This is a list of lighthouses in Costa Rica.

Lighthouses

See also
 Lists of lighthouses and lightvessels

References

External links

 

Costa Rica
Lighthouses

Lighthouses